("Spring song"), WAB 68, is a lied composed by Anton Bruckner in 1851 for the name-day of Aloisia Bogner.

History 
Bruckner composed the lied on a text of Heinrich Heine in 1851 for "the name-day of a blossoming spring rose", Bruckner's 16-year old pupil Aloisia Bogner, for whom he also composed Der Mondabend and the piano works Lancier-Quadrille, WAB 120, and Steiermärker, WAB 122.

Text 

Frühlingslied is based on a text by Heinrich Heine, with one minor change:

Music 
The 24-bar long work in A major is scored for solo voice and piano. This easy composition displays no relationship with Mendelssohn's Frühlingslied. The voice score is conducted cantabile, and the piano accompaniment uses a continuous figuration.

Discography 
There are two recordings of Frühlingslied:
 Robert Holzer (bass), Thomas Kerbl (piano), Anton Bruckner Lieder/Magnificat – CD: LIVA 046, 2011. NB: Transposed in F major.
 Elisabeth Wimmer (soprano), Daniel Linton-France (piano) in "Bruckner, Anton – Böck liest Bruckner I" – CD – Gramola 99195, 3 October 2018

References

Sources 
 August Göllerich, Anton Bruckner. Ein Lebens- und Schaffens-Bild,  – posthumous edited by Max Auer by G. Bosse, Regensburg, 1932
 Anton Bruckner – Sämtliche Werke, Band XXIII/1: Lieder für Gesang und Klavier (1851–1882), Musikwissenschaftlicher Verlag der Internationalen Bruckner-Gesellschaft, Angela Pachovsky (Editor), Vienna, 1997
 Cornelis van Zwol, Anton Bruckner 1824–1896 – Leven en werken, uitg. Thoth, Bussum, Netherlands, 2012. 
 Uwe Harten, Anton Bruckner. Ein Handbuch. , Salzburg, 1996. .
 Crawford Howie, Anton Bruckner - A documentary biography, online revised edition

External links 
 
 Frühlingslied A-Dur, 1851 - WAB 68 – Critical discography by Hans Roelofs 
 Robert Holzer's performance can also be heard on YouTube: A. Bruckner - Frühlingslied 
 Heine's original text with an English translation is available on The LiederNet Archive: Sweet chimes are softly filling my soul

Lieder by Anton Bruckner
1851 compositions
Compositions in A major